John Siket is a music producer, recording engineer, and mixer. He is best known for his work with Sonic Youth, Phish, Yo La Tengo, Dave Matthews Band, Blonde Redhead, Fountains of Wayne, Moe, Peter Murphy, Freedy Johnston, The Bottom Dollars and Ex Cops.

Selected discography

References

External links
Official Website
[ AllMusic Entry]

American record producers
American audio engineers
Living people
Year of birth missing (living people)